Billy Kenny (17 September 1871 – 19 May 1932) was an Australian rules footballer who played with South Melbourne in the Victorian Football League (VFL).

His son Bill Kenny also played for South Melbourne, in 1919.

Notes

External links 

1871 births
1932 deaths
Australian rules footballers from Melbourne
Sydney Swans players
People from South Melbourne